Pedro Conceição Alves (born 3 December 1999) also known as Cuadrado or Pedrinho is a Brazilian professional footballer who plays as a defender.

Career
On 14 January 2020, Pedrinho joined USL League One side North Texas SC from Guaraní. He made his debut for the club on 1 August 2020, appearing as an 81st-minute substitute during a 1–0 loss to Union Omaha. On 30 November 2020, Pedrinho was released by North Texas.

References

External links 
 

1999 births
Living people
Brazilian footballers
Brazilian expatriate footballers
Expatriate soccer players in the United States
Association football defenders
North Texas SC players
USL League One players